Kyle Rossiter (born June 9, 1980) is a Canadian former professional ice hockey defenceman who played in the National Hockey League for the Florida Panthers and the Atlanta Thrashers.

Playing career
Rossiter began has career with the Spokane Chiefs of the Western Hockey League and was later drafted 30th overall by the Panthers in the 1998 NHL Entry Draft.  He spent most of his career in AHL affiliates and managed to play 11 regular season games (9 with Florida and 2 with Atlanta) scoring 1 assist and collecting 11 penalty minutes. In 2005, Rossiter moved to Europe, playing in Finland's SM-liiga for KalPa and briefly in Italy for Asiago HC.

Personal
The oldest of 5 children, Rossiter has three sisters and a brother. Rossiter is now a Real Estate Agent in Edmonton. Since his retirement he has played senior hockey in the Chinook Hockey League with the Stony Plain Eagles.

Career statistics

Regular season and playoffs

International

References

External links
 

1980 births
Atlanta Thrashers players
Canadian ice hockey defencemen
Chicago Wolves players
Florida Panthers draft picks
Florida Panthers players
Asiago Hockey 1935 players
Ice hockey people from Edmonton
KalPa players
Living people
Louisville Panthers players
San Antonio Rampage players
Spokane Chiefs players
Utah Grizzlies (AHL) players
Wilkes-Barre/Scranton Penguins players
Canadian expatriate ice hockey players in Italy
Canadian expatriate ice hockey players in Finland